Thomas Orlando Lyttelton, 3rd Viscount Chandos (born 12 February 1953), is a British hereditary and life peer and politician for the Labour Party.

Early life
A member of the Lyttelton family, Chandos is the elder son of Antony Lyttelton, 2nd Viscount Chandos and Caroline Lascelles, a daughter of Sir Alan Lascelles (Private Secretary to both King George VI and Queen Elizabeth II).  He was educated at Eton and Worcester College, Oxford.

Career
Chandos succeeded his father in the viscountcy in 1980 but lost his seat in the House of Lords after the House of Lords Act 1999. However, in 2000 he was created a life peer as Baron Lyttelton of Aldershot, of Aldershot in the County of Hampshire and was able to return to the House of Lords.

Personal life
Chandos married Arabella Sarah Lucy Bailey, daughter of John Adrian Bailey and Lady Mary Baillie-Hamilton, on 19 October 1985.  They have three children:
 Hon Oliver Antony Lyttelton (born 21 February 1986), heir apparent to the viscountcy.
 Hon Benedict Lyttelton (born 30 April 1988)
 Hon Rosanna Mary Lyttelton (born 19 March 1990)

References

External links 
 

1953 births
Living people
Labour Party (UK) life peers
Viscounts in the Peerage of the United Kingdom
People educated at Eton College
Labour Party (UK) hereditary peers
Social Democratic Party (UK) hereditary peers
Thomas
Lyttelton
Life peers created by Elizabeth II
Chandos